Petlad is one of the 182 Legislative Assembly constituencies of Gujarat state in India. It is part of Anand district.

List of segments
This assembly seat represents the following segments,

 Petlad Taluka (Part) Villages – Ramol, Demol, Changa, Padgol, Sanjaya, Bamroli, Ravli, Ghunteli, Mahelav, Bandhni, Ravipura, Morad, Porda, Sunav, Vishnoli, Ardi, Sihol, Vatav, Palaj, Jesarva, Isarama, Rangaipura, Bhavanipura, Fangani, Bhatiel, Agas, Boriya, Ashi, Dantali, Jogan, Davalpura, Lakkadpura, Simarada, Virol(Simarada), Rupiyapura, Vishrampura, Shahpur, Sundarana, Bhalel, Petlad (M)
 Borsad Taluka (Part) Villages – Dhundakuva, Sur Kuva, Napa Talpad, Napa Vanto, Dahemi, Naman, Singlav, Dhobikui, Dedarda, Kavitha, Santokpura, Vahera, Dabhasi, Bochasan

Member of Legislative Assembly
2007 - Niranjan Patel, Indian National Congress
2012 - Niranjan Patel, Indian National Congress

Election results

2022

2017

2012

See also
 List of constituencies of the Gujarat Legislative Assembly
 Anand district

References

External links
 

Assembly constituencies of Gujarat
Anand district